In numerical analysis, leapfrog integration is a method for numerically integrating differential equations of the form

or equivalently of the form

particularly in the case of a dynamical system of classical mechanics. 

The method is known by different names in different disciplines.  In particular, it is similar to the velocity Verlet method, which is a variant of Verlet integration. Leapfrog integration is equivalent to updating positions  and velocities  at different interleaved time points, staggered in such a way that they "leapfrog" over each other.

Leapfrog integration is a second-order method, in contrast to Euler integration, which is only first-order, yet requires the same number of function evaluations per step.

Using Yoshida coefficients, applying the leapfrog integrator multiple times with the correct timesteps, a much higher order integrator can be generated.

Algorithm

In leapfrog integration, the equations for updating position and velocity are

These equations can be expressed in a form that gives velocity at integer steps as well:

However, in this synchronized form, the time-step  must be constant to maintain stability.

The synchronised form can be re-arranged to the 'kick-drift-kick' form;

which is primarily used where variable time-steps are required. The separation of the acceleration calculation onto the beginning and end of a step means that if time resolution is increased by a factor of two, then only one extra (computationally expensive) acceleration calculation is required.

One use of this equation is in gravity simulations, since in that case the acceleration depends only on the positions of the gravitating masses (and not on their velocities), although higher-order integrators (such as Runge–Kutta methods) are more frequently used.

There are two primary strengths to leapfrog integration when applied to mechanics problems. The first is the time-reversibility of the Leapfrog method. One can integrate forward n steps, and then reverse the direction of integration and integrate backwards n steps to arrive at the same starting position. The second strength is its symplectic nature, which sometimes allows for the conservation of a (slightly modified) energy of a dynamical system (only true for certain simple systems). This is especially useful when computing orbital dynamics, as many other integration schemes, such as the (order-4) Runge–Kutta method, do not conserve energy and allow the system to drift substantially over time.

Because of its time-reversibility, and because it is a symplectic integrator, leapfrog integration is also used in Hamiltonian Monte Carlo, a method for drawing random samples from a probability distribution whose overall normalization is unknown.

Yoshida algorithms
The leapfrog integrator can be converted into higher order integrators using techniques due to Haruo Yoshida. In this approach, the leapfrog is applied over a number of different timesteps. It turns out that when the correct timesteps are used in sequence, the errors cancel and far higher order integrators can be easily produced.

4th order Yoshida integrator
One step under the 4th order Yoshida integrator requires four intermediary steps. The position and velocity are computed at different times. Only three (computationally expensive) acceleration calculations are required. 

The equations for the 4th order integrator to update position and velocity are

Please note that position and velocity are computed at different times and some intermediary steps are backwards in time.

See also
Numerical methods for ordinary differential equations
Symplectic integration
Euler integration
Verlet integration
Runge–Kutta integration

References

External links
, Drexel University Physics

Numerical differential equations